Mohamed Kaba (born 27 October 2001) is a French professional footballer who plays as a midfielder for Ligue 2 club Valenciennes.

Career 
Kaba joined Valenciennes in 2019 and made his debuts with the reserve side in 2020. On 17 July 2021, he signed his first professional contract, tying him to the club for three years. On 24 July 2021, he made his professional debut in a 0–0 Ligue 2 draw to Niort.

Personal life
Born in France, Kaba is of Guinean descent.

References

External links 
 
 

2001 births
Living people
Footballers from Orléans
French footballers
French sportspeople of Guinean descent
Association football midfielders
Valenciennes FC players
Championnat National 3 players
Ligue 2 players
Black French sportspeople